Erigeron eximius is a North American species of flowering plants in the family Asteraceae known by the common name spruce-fir fleabane.

Erigeron eximius  is native to the western United States. It is found in alpine meadows and in openings in aspen and spruce/fir forests in Wyoming, Colorado, Utah, Arizona, New Mexico, and western Texas.

Erigeron eximius  is a perennial herb up to 60 centimeters (2 feet) in height, spreading by means of underground rhizomes. Each stem can produce 1-15 flower heads, each with as many as 80 blue or lavender ray florets surrounding numerous yellow disc florets.

References

eximius
Flora of the Western United States
Plants described in 1898
Flora without expected TNC conservation status